Mount Emery is a mountain on West Falkland, Falkland Islands. It is north east of Mount Young.

References

Emery